Cocoon is the fourth studio album by Meg & Dia.

Track listing

References

External links
Meg & Dia Website
Meg & Dia Onesheet
Under The Gun Review

2011 albums
Meg & Dia albums